Iron Realms Entertainment (formerly known as Achaea LLC) is a computer game development company that has created the MUDs  Achaea, Dreams of Divine Lands; Aetolia, The Midnight Age; Imperian, the Sundered Heavens; Lusternia, Age of Ascension; and Midkemia Online. Matt Mihaly is its founder and CEO and Jeremy Saunders is its president.

Games
Games developed by Iron Realms Entertainment include:
 Achaea, Dreams of Divine Lands, a high fantasy text-based MUD operating continuously since 1997.
 Aetolia, The Midnight Age, a roleplay-intensive text-based MUD set in a Gothic fantasy world with numerous player-run political organizations.
 Imperian, the Sundered Heavens, a fantasy MUD set in a world ravaged by natural catastrophe.
 Lusternia, a text-based MUD game set in a fantasy sword and sorcery world revolving around four city-states and two nature communes.
 Midkemia Online, a text-based MUD game based on author Raymond E. Feist's Midkemia universe.  It was shut down in 2015, partially due to the cost of maintaining the license.
 Starmourn, a science-fiction MUD announced by Iron Realms as under development in May, 2016.

Rapture Engine
The Rapture Engine was created by Iron Realms Entertainment and is used by all of its MUDs, albeit heavily modified for those most recently in production.

Rapture was used to develop an interactive chat system in conjunction with a United Nations affiliated organization for the 7th Annual World Summit of Young Entrepreneurs.

History

Iron Realms Entertainment LLC was founded as Achaea LLC in 1996.  After the release of Aetolia in 2001, Achaea LLC was renamed Iron Realms LLC.

In 2004, IRE was featured in Computer Gaming World and on Wired News after the release of an "addictive" virtual drug called gleam.

Achaea was featured in the June 10, 2004 episode of The Screen Savers.

References

External links
 Iron Realms Entertainment official site
 NoGFX (No Graphics): Logs posting site for IRE MUDs

Video game companies established in 1996
MUD organizations
Video game development companies
Virtual economies
Video game companies of the United States